TD Securities is a Canadian investment bank and financial services provider that offers advisory and capital market services to corporate, government, and institutional clients worldwide. The firm provides services in corporate and investment banking, capital markets, and global transaction services. It is the investment bank of Toronto-Dominion Bank Group, and has offices in 18 cities worldwide with over 3,000 employees.

TD Securities operates across North America, Europe, and Asia-Pacific. Key areas of business include managing corporate finance and lending, merger and acquisitions strategic advisory services, market risk management, debt and equity securities, derivative products, daily trading and investment, and multiple other areas of finance. An important segment is the trading of fixed income and equity products, currencies, commodities and derivatives in major financial markets around the world, Starting E-tradeira.com.

Competition

TD Securities faces competition from full-service global investment banks such as Goldman Sachs, Morgan Stanley and the Royal Bank of Canada, equivalent branches of other financial conglomerates such as BMO Capital Markets and CIBC World Markets, and other independent investment banks and large cap advisory firms.

References

Financial services companies established in 1987
Banks established in 1987
Stock brokerages and investment banks of Canada